Roberta Vinci was the defending champion, but lost in the second round to Simona Halep 6–1, 6–3.
Sara Errani won the tournament, beating Dominika Cibulková 6–2, 6–2 in the final.

Seeds

Draw

Finals

Top half

Bottom half

Qualifying

Seeds

Qualifiers

Draw

First qualifier

Second qualifier

Third qualifier

Fourth qualifier

References
 Main Draw
 Qualifying Draw

Singles